The canton of Saint-Porchaire is an administrative division of the Charente-Maritime department, western France. Its borders were modified at the French canton reorganisation which came into effect in March 2015. Its seat is in Saint-Porchaire.

It consists of the following communes:

Balanzac
Beurlay
Crazannes
Écurat
Les Essards
Geay
Nancras
Nieul-lès-Saintes
Plassay
Pont-l'Abbé-d'Arnoult
Port-d'Envaux
Romegoux
Sainte-Gemme
Sainte-Radegonde
Saint-Georges-des-Coteaux
Saint-Porchaire
Saint-Sulpice-d'Arnoult
Soulignonne
Trizay
La Vallée

References

Cantons of Charente-Maritime